This list of telemedicine services providers is for notable telemedicine, telehealth, and mobile health providers and services. This includes virtual care facilities for remote care, services or platforms used for specific steps within the healthcare industry, and clinical navigation.

Mobile health

Software platforms connecting patients with healthcare providers 

 Curoflow - Established in 2020. A Swedish telemedicine platform that enables healthcare providers to offer a digital front door for their patients.
 AccuRx - Established in 2016. A British software company that provides messaging services for doctors to communicate with patients via text.
 Amwell - Established in 2006. Formerly known as American Well, a telemedicine company that connects patients with doctors over a secure video platform.

Teledentistry 
 SmileDirectClub - Established in 2014. A teledentistry company that provides teeth straightening services.

Teleradiology

Virtual care facilities 

 Mercy Virtual - Established in 2015. A virtual care center that operates solely through the use of telemedicine.
 Teladoc Health - Established in 2002. A telemedicine and virtual healthcare company based in the United States that facilitates virtual visits between patients and doctors.

Miscellaneous 
 Hims & Hers Health - Established in 2017.  An American telehealth company that sells prescription and over-the-counter drugs online (especially those that treat erectile dysfunction and hair loss), as well as personal care products.
 Phreesia - Established in 2005. A software-as-a-service company that provides patient intake management.
 Your.MD - A digital healthtech company that uses AI to provide users with health information via a chatbot.
 Zocdoc - Established in 2007. An online medical care appointment booking service and medical care search facility.

References 

Telemedicine
Telehealth